Morgan Advanced Materials is a company which manufactures specialist products, using carbon, advanced ceramics and composites. The company is headquartered in Windsor, United Kingdom, and has 85 sites across 30 countries. A public limited company, it is listed on the London Stock Exchange and is a constituent of the FTSE 250 Index.

History

From formation to flotation
The six Morgan brothers (William, Thomas, Walter, Edward, Octavius and Septimus) began as importers and exporters in the City of London trading as "Druggist Salesmen and Hardware Merchants". An American crucible, made to a new process, was shown at the Great Exhibition of 1851 and seen by the brothers. The distinguishing feature of the “new process” involved mixing the clay with graphite, then usually known as plumbago or black lead, giving it much greater durability. The brothers obtained the sole agency for the British Empire from the manufacturers, Joseph Dixon, and in 1856 formed the Patent Plumbago Crucible Company, acquiring a site in Battersea for its manufacture. One of the features of the early years was extensive international scope of the business, both in the marketing of the crucible and the search for the ideal graphite – first in Ceylon and then Madagascar. By the 1870s, the firm, then trading under the easier name of Morgan Crucible, was said to be the largest manufacturer of crucibles in the world.

In 1890, Morgan Crucible became a company; it was no longer a family concern although the shares remained in the hands of directors and senior executives, and it remained so until 1946. By 1900, the staff at Battersea totalled over 420 and the company was continually exploring other avenues for its graphite expertise. In the early 1900s lengthy development work was undertaken on electric bushes and by the end of World War I it was an established part of the business. Other refractory products, including furnace linings, were developed and in 1947 production moved to a new factory in Neston as Morgan Refractories. Other carbon specialisations included lighting carbons and resistors, the latter being large enough to move into a new factory in County Durham in 1948.

At the private AGM in August 1946, the Chairman announced "a departure from our 60-year-old policy of retaining the whole of the equity in the hands of workers and ex workers." There was to be a public listing on the London Stock Exchange with the issue of new shares but it was expected that the employees would still control the majority of the equity. The fundraising was duly completed the next month; the company was described as the largest manufacturer of plumbago crucibles in the world and also holding “a leading position as manufacturers of carbon products used on rotating electrical equipment”.

Morganite
In 1939 the company's subsidiary Morganite Crucible opened its works at Norton in Worcestershire. During the Second World War this facility employed European Voluntary Workers who were accommodated at Bowbrook House in nearby Peopleton. In 2010 the site, which had recently been closed, was sold for use as an industrial estate; in part of the site, Molten Metal Products Ltd was set up by former Morgan employees Dave Hill and Jim Ritchie, to distribute Morganite products and manufacture Morgan furnaces under licence.

Early adopter of computers
In 1954 the company became one of the first businesses in the UK to computerise its financial records, with the first order of a HEC4 computer, operational in 1955. In 1964 the first commercial sale of the ICT 1900 series computer was to the company.

Late 20th century
A joint venture of Morgan's Thermal Ceramics division and the Carborundum Universal company, part of the Indian industrial conglomerate Murugappa Group, has existed since 1982.

21st century
The company changed its name to Morgan Advanced Materials in February 2013 to reflect the fact that it produces a variety of different products and supplies to many different industries.

In September 2020 the company's headquarters moved from the Quadrant to York House, also in the centre of Windsor.

In February 2023, the company announced that it had been hit by a cyber-security incident which had taken some of its systems offline and may cost it up to £12 million.

References

External links
Official site
Grace's Guide

Manufacturing companies established in 1856
Manufacturing companies of the United Kingdom
Ceramics manufacturers of the United Kingdom
Companies based in Berkshire
Companies listed on the London Stock Exchange
1856 establishments in England
British companies established in 1856